The 1874 college football season had no clear-cut champion, with the Official NCAA Division I Football Records Book listing Princeton, Harvard, and Yale as having been selected national champions. Only Princeton and Yale officially claim championships for this season.

The Harvard vs. McGill game played on May 15, 1874, was the first rugby-style football game played in the United States.

Conference standings

References